Stijn van der Meer (born May 1, 1993) is a Dutch professional baseball shortstop for Curaçao Neptunus of the Honkbal Hoofdklasse.

Van der Meer attended Lamar University. The Astros selected him in the 34th round of the 2016 MLB draft. He signed and spent the season with both the GCL Astros and Greeneville Astros, slashing .329/.404/.418 in 29 games. He began 2017 with the Buies Creek Astros but was released after six games. 

He played for the Netherlands national baseball team in the 2017 World Baseball Classic.

References

External links

1993 births
2016 European Baseball Championship players
2017 World Baseball Classic players
Baseball shortstops
Buies Creek Astros players
Curacao Neptunus players
DOOR Neptunus players
Dutch expatriate baseball players in the United States
Greeneville Astros players
Gulf Coast Astros players
Lamar Cardinals baseball players
Living people
People from Rosmalen
Sportspeople from North Brabant